The 2010–11 Perth Glory FC season was the club's 14th season since its establishment in 1996. The club competed in the A-League for the 6th time.

Players

First team squad

Transfers

In:

 

Out:

Matches

2010–11 pre-season friendlies

2010–11 Hyundai A-League fixtures

A-League table

Statistics

Goal scorers

Assists

Disciplinary record

References

2010–11
2010–11 A-League season by team